Santo Tomás Hueyotlipan Municipality is a municipality in Puebla in south-eastern Mexico.

References

 http://www.microrregiones.gob.mx/catloc/LocdeMun.aspx?tipo=clave&campo=loc&ent=21&mun=151

Municipalities of Puebla